Best Hits is a greatest hits compilation from 2 Unlimited, a Eurodance project founded in 1991 by Belgian producers Jean-Paul DeCoster and Phil Wilde and fronted by Dutch rapper Ray Slijngaard and Dutch vocalist Anita Doth.

Album information
This album contains 16 2 Unlimited tracks.  Included are hit singles and album tracks from studio albums Get Ready!, No Limits and Real Things.

Release History
Best Hits was released in 1995 through record label Byte Records in Sweden.

Track listing
 "No Limit" – 3:44
 "The Real Thing" – 3:40
 "Do What I Like" - 4:10
 "Tribal Dance" – 4:23
 "Faces" 3:48
 "Maximum Overdrive" 3:58
 "Let The Beat Control Your Body" – 4:08
 "R.U.O.K." - 4:17
 "Sensuality" - 4:30
 "No One" - 3:26
 "Here I Go" - 5:13
 "Burning Like Fire" - 4:59
 "Info Superhighway" - 4:34
 "Hypnotized" - 4:24
 "Get Ready For This" – 3:42
 "The Power Age" - 4:06

References

2 Unlimited albums
1995 greatest hits albums
Byte Records albums